Fontaine-le-Comte is a commune in the Vienne department in the Nouvelle-Aquitaine region in western France.

Population

See also
Communes of the Vienne department

References

External links

 Fontaine-le-Comte Abbey

Communes of Vienne